The 1981 NCAA Men's Division II Ice Hockey Tournament involved 4 schools playing in single-elimination play to determine the national champion of men's NCAA Division II college ice hockey.  A total of 4 games were played, hosted by Merrimack College.

The University of Lowell, coached by Bill Riley, won the national title with a 5-4 victory in the final game over Plattsburgh.

Tom Mulligan, of the University of Lowell, was named the Most Outstanding Player and was the high scorer of the tournament with seven points (3 goals, 4 assists).

Qualifying teams
Due to the lack of conferences and tournaments for western schools the NCAA held a regional tournament to help select teams for the national tournament. The western regional tournament is not considered as part of the NCAA championship but is included here for reference. No automatic bids were offered.

Western Regional Tournament

National Tournament Teams

Bracket

Note: * denotes overtime period(s)

All-Tournament Team

G: Rick Strack (Plattsburgh State)
D: Tom Mulligan (Lowell)
D: Tod Wescott (Plattsburgh State)
F: Dean Jenkins (Lowell)
F: Pierre Brunett (Plattsburgh State)
F: Mike Carr (Lowell)

External links

NCAA men's ice hockey championship
 
NCAA Men's Division II Ice Hockey Tournament
NCAA Division II men's ice hockey tournament